The  is the main residence of the Emperor of Japan. It is a large park-like area located in the Chiyoda district of the Chiyoda ward of Tokyo and contains several buildings including the  where the Emperor has his living quarters, the  where various ceremonies and receptions take place, some residences of the Imperial Family, an archive, museums and administrative offices.

It is built on the site of the old Edo Castle. During the height of the 1980s Japanese property bubble, the palace grounds were valued by some to be more than the value of all of the real estate in the U.S. state of California.

History

Edo castle

After the capitulation of the shogunate and the Meiji Restoration, the inhabitants, including the Shōgun Tokugawa Yoshinobu, were required to vacate the premises of the Edo Castle. At this time, Tōkyō had also been called Tōkei.

Previous fires had destroyed the Honmaru area containing the old donjon (which itself burned in the 1657 Meireki fire). On the night of 5 May 1873, a fire consumed the Nishinomaru Palace (formerly the shōgun's residence), and the new imperial  was constructed on the site in 1888. The castle has many gardens.

A non-profit  was founded in 2004 with the aim of a historically correct reconstruction of at least the main donjon. In March 2013, Naotaka Kotake, head of the group, said that "the capital city needs a symbolic building", and that the group planned to collect donations and signatures on a petition in support of rebuilding the tower. A reconstruction blueprint had been made based on old documents. The Imperial Household Agency at the time had not indicated whether it would support the project.

The Old palace

In the Meiji period, most structures from the Edo Castle disappeared. Some were cleared to make way for other buildings while others were destroyed by earthquakes and fire. For example, the wooden  over the moat were replaced with stone and iron bridges. The buildings of the Imperial Palace constructed in the Meiji era were constructed of wood. Their design employed traditional Japanese architecture in their exterior appearance while the interiors were an eclectic mixture of fashionable Japanese and European elements. The ceilings of the grand chambers were coffered with Japanese elements; however, Western chairs, tables and heavy curtains furnished the spaces. The floors of the public rooms had parquets or carpets while the residential spaces used traditional tatami mats.

The main audience hall was the central part of the palace. It was the largest building in the compound. Guests were received there for public events. In the interior, the coffered ceiling was traditional Japanese-style, while the floor was parquetry. The roof was styled similarly to the Kyoto Imperial Palace, but was covered with (fireproof) copper plates rather than Japanese cypress shingles.

In the late Taishō and early Shōwa period, more concrete buildings were added, such as the headquarters of the Imperial Household Ministry and the Privy Council. These structures exhibited only token Japanese elements.

From 1888 to 1948, the compound was called . On the night of 25 May 1945, most structures of the Imperial Palace were destroyed in the Allied firebombing raid on Tokyo. According to the US bomber pilot Richard Lineberger, Emperor's Palace was the target of their special mission on July 29, 1945, and was hit with 2000-pound bombs.

Due to the large-scale destruction of the Meiji-era palace, a new  and residences were constructed on the western portion of the site in 1964–1968, designed by architect Junzō Yoshimura. The area was renamed  in 1948, while the eastern part was renamed  and became a public park in 1968.

Interior images of the old Meiji-era palace

Present palace 

The present Imperial Palace encompasses the retrenchments of the former Edo Castle. The modern   designed for various imperial court functions and receptions is located in the old Nishinomaru section of the palace grounds. Designed by Japanese architect Shōzō Uchii the modern residence was completed in 1993. This residence is currently (July 2020) not in use and being prepared for Naruhito, who for the time being keeps his primary residence at the former Tōgū Palace, renamed  while he resides there.

Except for the Imperial Household Agency and the East Gardens, the main grounds of the palace are generally closed to the public, except for reserved guided tours from Tuesdays to Saturdays (which access only the Kyūden Totei Plaza in front of the Chowaden). Each New Year (January 2) and Emperor's Birthday, the public is permitted to enter through the Nakamon (inner gate) where they gather in the Kyūden Totei Plaza. The Imperial Family appears on the balcony before the crowd and the Emperor normally gives a short speech greeting and thanking the visitors and wishing them good health and blessings. Parts of the Fukiage garden are sometimes open to the general public.

The old Honmaru, Ninomaru, and Sannomaru compounds now comprise the East Gardens, an area with public access containing administrative and other public buildings.

The Kitanomaru Park is located to the north and is the former northern enceinte of Edo Castle. It is a public park and is the site of the Nippon Budokan. To the south is Kokyo Gaien National Garden.

Though much of the site is off limits to the public, there have been multiple instances of tourists attempting to trespass on the palace grounds by swimming in the moat. In 2008, a British tourist stripped naked, repeatedly dove into and swam across the moat in an attempt to avoid being arrested, and used stones and a plastic pole as weapons when faced by staff and local police officers. A similar incident took place in 2013, in which two drunken tourists decided to try to sneak into the palace building after removing their clothing and entering the water near Sakurada Gate.

Grounds

Kyūden 

The  and the headquarters of the Imperial Household Agency are located in the former Nishinomaru enceinte (West Citadel) of the Edo Castle.

The main buildings of the palace grounds, including the  main palace, home of the liaison conference of the Imperial General Headquarters, were severely damaged by the fire of May 1945. Today's palace consists of multiple modern structures that are interconnected. The palace complex was finished in 1968 and was constructed of steel-framed reinforced concrete structures produced domestically, with two stories above ground and one story below. The buildings of the Imperial Palace were constructed by the Takenaka Corporation in a modernist style with clear Japanese architectural references such as the large, gabled hipped roof, columns and beams.

The complex consists of six wings, including:
 Seiden State Function Hall
 Hōmeiden State Banquet Hall
 Chōwaden Reception Hall
 Rensui Dining Room
 Chigusa Chidori Drawing Room and
 The Emperor's work office

Halls include the Minami-Damari, Nami-no-Ma, multiple corridors, Kita-Damari, Shakkyō-no-Ma, Shunju-no-Ma, Seiden-Sugitoe (Kaede), Seiden-Sugitoe (Sakura), Take-no-Ma, Ume-no-Ma and Matsu-no-Ma. Famous Nihonga artists such as Maeda Seison were commissioned to paint the artworks.

The Kyūden is used for both receiving state guests and holding official state ceremonies and functions. The Matsu-no-Ma (Pine Chamber) is the throne room. The Emperor gives audiences to the Prime Minister in this room, as well as appointing or dismissing ambassadors and Ministers of State. It is also the room where the Prime Minister and Chief Justice is appointed to office.

Fukiage Garden 
The Fukiage Garden has carried the name since the Edo period and is used as the residential area for the Imperial Family.

The , achieved in 1993, was used as the primary residence of Akihito from December 8, 1993, to March 2020. After a period of refurbishment, Naruhito, Masako and Aiko moved in in September 2021.

The  in the northern section was originally the residence of Emperor Showa and Empress Kōjun and was called the Fukiage Palace. After the Emperor's death in 1989, the palace was renamed the Fukiage Ōmiya Palace and was the residence of the Empress Dowager until her death in 2000. It is currently not in use.

Parts of the Imperial Regalia of Japan are kept here and the sanctuary plays a religious role in imperial enthronements and weddings.

East Gardens 

Located on the grounds of the East Gardens is the Imperial Tokagakudo Music Hall, the Music Department of the Board of Ceremonies of the Imperial Household, the Archives and Mausolea Department Imperial Household Agency, structures for the guards such as the Saineikan dojo, and the Museum of the Imperial Collections.

Several structures that were added since the Meiji period were removed over time to allow construction of the East Garden. In 1932, the kuretake-ryō was built as a dormitory for imperial princesses, however this building was removed prior to the construction of the present gardens. Other buildings such as stables and housing were removed to create the East Garden in its present configuration.

Construction work began in 1961 with a new pond in the Ninomaru, as well as the repair and restoration of various keeps and structures from the Edo period. On 30 May 1963, the area was declared by the Japanese government a "Special Historic Relic" under the Cultural Properties Protection Law.

Tōkagakudō (Music Hall) 

The  is located to the east of the former main donjon of Edo Castle in the Honmaru. This music hall was built in commemoration of the 60th birthday of Empress Kōjun on 6 March 1963. The hall is octagon-shaped and each of its eight outer walls is decorated with differently designed mosaic tiles. Construction began in August 1964 and was completed in February 1966.

Ninomaru Garden 
Symbolic trees representing each prefecture in Japan are planted in the northwestern corner of Ninomaru enceinte. Such trees have been donated from each prefecture and there are total of 260, covering 30 varieties.

The small Ninomaru Garden at the foot of the castle hill was originally planted in 1636 by Kobori Enshu, a famed landscape artist and garden designer, but it was destroyed by fire in 1867. The current layout was created in 1968, based on a plan drawn up during the reign of ninth shogun, Tokugawa Ieshige.

Suwa no Chaya 
The  is a teahouse that was located in the Fukiage Garden during the Edo period. It moved to the Akasaka Palace after the Meiji restoration, but was reconstructed in its original location in 1912.

It was moved to its present location during the construction of the East Garden.

Kitanomaru 
The Kitanomaru Park is located to the north and is the former northern enceinte of Edo Castle. It is a public park and is the site of Nippon Budokan Hall.

Kōkyo-gaien 

Gallery

References

External links 

Imperial Household Agency | Imperial Palace in Tokyo
Image gallery of the Imperial Palace
Imperial Palace Map
Information on visiting the Imperial Palace on the Emperor's birthday

 
Palaces in Tokyo
Gardens in Tokyo
Rebuilt buildings and structures in Japan
Buildings and structures in Japan destroyed during World War II